Siricae, also known as Siricis, and possibly as Saricha, was a town of ancient Cappadocia on the road from Comana to Melitene, 24 miles northwest of the first.

Its site is located near Keklikoluk, Asiatic Turkey.

References

Populated places in ancient Cappadocia
Former populated places in Turkey
Populated places of the Byzantine Empire
Roman towns and cities in Turkey
History of Kahramanmaraş Province